Lophoplusia pterylota is a moth of the family Noctuidae. It was first described by Edward Meyrick in 1904. It is endemic to the Hawaiian islands of Oahu, Maui and Hawaii.

Larvae have been recorded feeding on hollyhock.

External links

Endemic moths of Hawaii
Plusiinae